The 1145 papal election followed the death of Pope Lucius II and resulted in the election of Pope Eugene III, the first pope of the Order of Cistercians.

Election of Eugene III
Pope Lucius II, during the whole of his pontificate, had to face the municipal commune at Rome, hostile towards the secular rule of the popes in the Eternal City. The republican faction elected Giordano Pierleoni, brother of the former Antipope Anacletus II, to the post of senator, and demanded that Lucius relinquish all temporal matters into his hands. The pope refused and led a small army against the seat of the commune on Capitol. He was defeated and seriously wounded in this attack, and died on 15 February 1145 in the church of S. Gregorio in clivo scauri. The cardinals present at Rome quickly assembled in the church of San Cesareo in Palatio and on the very same day unanimously elected to the papacy Bernardo da Pisa, pupil of St. Bernard of Clairvaux, who was abbot of the Cistercian monastery of S. Anastasio alle Tre Fontane near Rome and probably did not belong to the College of Cardinals. The elect took the name of Eugene III. Due to hostility of the Roman people, his consecration took place in the monastery of Farfa on 18 February 1145.

Cardinal-electors
There were probably 40 cardinals in the Sacred College of Cardinals in February 1145. Based on examination of the subscriptions of the papal bulls in 1145 and the available data about the external missions of the cardinals it is possible to establish that no more than 34 cardinals participated in the election:

Thirteen electors were created by Pope Innocent II, nine by Celestine II, eleven by Lucius II, one by Pope Callixtus II and one by Pope Paschalis II.

Absentees

Notes

Sources

12th-century elections
1145
1145
1145 in Europe
12th-century Catholicism